The M1 locomotive was a class of locomotives, used by Sri Lanka Railways, imported from 1953, and manufactured by Brush Bagnall Traction.

The locomotives weighed  had a  V12 Mirlees JS12VT four-stroke engine. The Sri Lanka railway had a fleet of 25 of these Class M1 locomotives which began introduction in 1953 and were removed from service from 1983.

Locomotive number 560 is the subject of a restoration attempt.

Introduction

In the 1950s Sri Lankan railway was seeking replacements for old rolling stock, routine replacement of which had been delayed by World War II. Several firms tendered for the contact; American suppliers were unable to enter a competitive bid due to the devaluation of both the rupee and British pound.

Five locomotives were supplied (deliveries beginning Jan. 1953) for operational testing – Brush had not been able to fully stress test the units in England due to an absence of a full scale  test track.

During testing engine overheating was found to be a serious problem on the steeply graded and curving mainline. Other issues requiring attention included fuel pump problems including air-locks, and bogie frame cracking. The electrical circuit for torque control was also modified.

The remaining twenty locomotives, with modifications required to resolve the issues found during testing were delivered from May 1954, at a rate of approximately 1 per month.

See also 
 Locomotives of Sri Lanka Railways
 Sri Lanka Railways
 Sri Lanka Railways

References

Sources

External links

Railway locomotives introduced in 1953
M01
Brush Traction locomotives
A1A-A1A locomotives
5 ft 6 in gauge locomotives